The Australian women's cricket team toured England between May and August 1976. The test series against England women's cricket team was played for the Women's Ashes, which England were defending. The series was drawn 0–0, meaning that England retained the Ashes. England won the three-match ODI series 2–1. The second ODI, won by England, was the first women's cricket match ever played at Lord's.

Squads

Tour Matches

1-day single innings matches

2-day matches

Test Series

1st Test

2nd Test

3rd Test

WODI Series

1st ODI

2nd ODI

3rd ODI

References

External links
Australia Women tour of England 1976 from Cricinfo

The Women's Ashes
Women's cricket tours of England
Australia women's national cricket team tours